The Chitral Fort is a fortification in Chitral town, Khyber Pakhtunkhwa, Pakistan. The fort is situated on the banks of the Chitral River. The fort has a commanding position on the river and is believed to have been built in 1774 during the reign of Mohtaram Shah Katur II and restored in 1911 by His Highness Sir Shuja ul-Mulk. The compound used to house the barracks of the guards of Mehtar of Chitral.

The fort was declared as the personal property of the last ruler of Chitral following the merger of Chitral State in 1969. It is now occupied by the current ceremonial Mehtar, Fateh-ul-Mulk Ali Nasir who has renovated the old Darbar Hall and state rooms following damage sustained during the earthquake of 2015.

Chitral Expedition 

The Chitral Expedition was a military expedition in 1895 sent by the British authorities to relieve the fort which was under siege after a local coup. After the death of the old ruler, power changed hands several times. An intervening British force of about 400 men was besieged in the fort until it was relieved by two expeditions, a small one from Gilgit and a larger one from Peshawar.

See also
 Chitral Valley
 Chitral (princely state)
 List of forts in Pakistan

References

Forts in Khyber Pakhtunkhwa
Chitral District
History of Chitral